Tomàs-Llorenç Guarino Sabaté (born 5 July 1999) is a Spanish figure skater. He is the 2021 Open d'Andorra champion, the 2021 Egna Spring Trophy bronze medalist, and a two-time Spanish national champion.

Personal life 
Guarino Sabaté was born 5 July 1999 in Barcelona. He began studying at International University of La Rioja in January 2021.

Career

Early years 
Guarino Sabaté began learning to skate in 2007. As an advanced novice, he competed internationally for Spain and won the national title in that category in December 2014. The following season, he moved up to the junior ranks and represented Spain at two events, in September and November 2015.

Career for Switzerland 
Deciding to represent Switzerland, Guarino Sabaté debuted for his new country in November 2016 at the NRW Trophy in Germany. As a junior, he competed three seasons for Switzerland, appearing at two ISU Junior Grand Prix events. In December 2018, he became the Swiss national bronze medalist in the senior men's category. He trained in La Chaux-de-Fonds, coached by Bernard Glesser (2017–18 season) and by Jean-François Ballester (2018–19 season).

Guarino Sabaté made his senior international debut in October 2019, placing 16th at the 2019 CS Finlandia Trophy. In November, he won bronze at the Open d'Andorra. It was his final international appearance for Switzerland. The following month, he finished fourth at the Swiss Championships.

2020–21 season 
After not competing in 2020, Guarino Sabaté resumed his career for Spain in February 2021 at the International Challenge Cup in the Netherlands. He won the Spanish national title in March and took bronze at the Egna Spring Trophy in April.

2021–22 season 
In September, Guarino Sabaté placed sixteenth at the 2021 CS Nebelhorn Trophy, an Olympic qualifying event. He won gold at the Open d'Andorra in November and then his second national title in December. He was subsequently selected to compete at his first ISU Championship, the 2022 European Championships in Tallinn, Estonia, where he qualified to the free skate and finished in twenty-second place. To end the season, he was twenty-first at the 2022 World Championships.

2022–23 season 
Beginning the new season at the Nebelhorn Trophy again, Guarino Sabaté came fifth. At two other Challenger events, he was sixth at the 2022 CS Budapest Trophy and fourth at the 2022 CS Ice Challenge. Guarino Sabaté was fifth at the Santa Claus Cup, before winning a third Spanish national title.

Guarino Sabaté finished fourteenth at the 2023 Winter World University Games, and twelfth at the 2023 European Championships.

Programs

Competitive highlights 
CS: Challenger Series; JGP: Junior Grand Prix

For Spain

For Switzerland

For Spain: Early years 

Levels: N = Advanced novice; J = Junior

References

External links 
 

1999 births
Spanish male single skaters
Swiss male single skaters
Living people
Sportspeople from Barcelona
Competitors at the 2023 Winter World University Games